Judith Caroline Spence (born 19 May 1957) is an Australian politician and former member of the Legislative Assembly of Queensland for the Labor Party, from the 1989 election to 2012. She represented Mount Gravatt until 2009, but after a redistribution she switched to Sunnybank, which covered much of the same territory. She was Leader of the House, a role responsible for the co-ordination and management of Government business in the Assembly from 7 April 2009 to 24 March 2012.

Early life 
Spence was born in Brisbane on 19 May 1957 and obtained a Bachelor of Arts and Diploma of Teaching before becoming a secondary school teacher.

Political career 
Spence was elected to Parliament at the 1989 election on 2 December 1989, defeating National MP Ian Henderson and becoming the first Labor member for the seat in 32 years. She was a member of various committees and, upon the defeat of the Goss government as a result of the Mundingburra by-election, became Shadow Minister for Consumer Affairs and Women in the Beattie shadow cabinet in February 1996, adding Aboriginal and Islander Affairs to her shadow responsibilities in December 1996.

After the 1998 state election, where Labor won minority government, she became Minister for Women's Policy, Aboriginal and Islander Affairs and Fair Trading in the Beattie Ministry. In 2000, she resigned from the Left faction of the Labor Party and joined the dominant Labor Unity faction. At the 2001 state election, she retained Aboriginal and Islander Affairs but otherwise moved to Families and Disability Services. In 2004 she was promoted to Minister for Police and Corrective Services, in which she served until the 2009 election. She was demoted to Parliamentary Secretary assisting the Premier and Minister for Arts at this time by Premier Anna Bligh, attributed by some analysts to the settling of a dispute arising from her earlier factional switch, but she was appointed to the senior position of Leader of the House the following day.

Spence stood down from Parliament at the 2012 election.

Personal life 
She is a member of Amnesty International and several schools' Parents & Citizens committees.

Notes

1957 births
Living people
Members of the Queensland Legislative Assembly
Griffith University alumni
People from Brisbane
Australian Labor Party members of the Parliament of Queensland
21st-century Australian politicians
21st-century Australian women politicians
Women members of the Queensland Legislative Assembly